Voice of the Strait, Founded on August 24, 1958. the predecessor is the PLA Fujian Front Line Broadcasting Station, established in Yuandang Street No. 15, Gulou District, Fuzhou city, Fujian province, People's Republic of China. is composed of People's Liberation Army opened stations, mainly for the Taiwan radio, broadcast radio the Mandarin and Minnan language dialect program, now has 5 broadcast channels, also set up Chinese classical network radio. The platform is provided with the official website of the network.

The radio's wave power is very large; waves mainly cover Taiwan and East China, Asia, Europe, Africa, Oceania and America, and even the Arctic and Antarctic can also receive shortwave broadcasts belonging to the international radio. While the Mediumwave of power is very small, in the daytime distance near the launch site, almost can not receive.

The interval signal is a bell rendition of "Three Rules of Discipline and Eight Points for Attention".

In 2015, the unit which operates Voice of the Strait was transferred from the People's Liberation Army General Political Department to the People's Liberation Army Strategic Support Force becoming PLASSF Base 311. Base 311 (also known as PLA Unit 61716) is primarily responsible for psychological warfare operations against Taiwan.

Frequency 
 News Radio: MW 666 kHz, SW 4940 kHz
 Minnan Radio: MW 783 kHz, SW 6115 kHz
 General Radio: FM 97.9 MHz
 Car & Life Radio: FM 90.6 MHz
 Sunshine FM: FM 99.6 MHz

See also 
 Cross-Strait war of propaganda
Voice of Han
Fu Hsing Broadcasting Station
 China National Radio
 Radio Taiwan International

References

External links

Shortwave radio stations
International broadcasters
Radio stations in China
Mandarin-language radio stations
Mass media in Fujian
Fuzhou
Psychological operations units and formations
Disinformation operations
People's Liberation Army General Political Department
Information operations units and formations
Mass media of the military
People's Liberation Army Strategic Support Force